The 1984–85 NBA season was the 39th season of the National Basketball Association. The season ended with the Los Angeles Lakers winning the NBA Championship, beating the Boston Celtics 4 games to 2 in the NBA Finals.

Notable occurrences
The 1985 NBA All-Star Game was played at Hoosier Dome in Indianapolis, with the West defeating the East 140–129. Ralph Sampson of the Houston Rockets won the game's MVP award. Dominique Wilkins of the Atlanta Hawks won the Slam Dunk Contest.
Michael Jordan became the only rookie in NBA history to lead a team in four statistics (points, assists, rebounds, steals).
The Clippers relocated from San Diego to Los Angeles. This created a situation with two teams of the same host name (the other Los Angeles team being the Lakers) in the same division, the Pacific, similar to the one in the NHL where the Patrick Division (at the time, and now the Metropolitan Division) had two teams of the same host name: the New York Islanders and Rangers. There was a similar scenario which only existed in the 1976–77 season, in which the Atlantic Division had the New York Knicks and the Nets, until the Nets moved to New Jersey the following season and changed their name.
Turner Broadcasting began a relationship with the NBA that continues today when TBS signed a two-year, $20 million deal with the NBA.
The Kings played their final game in Kansas City, Missouri, and moved their franchise to Sacramento the following season.
Knicks forward Bernard King, who finished the year as the scoring champion, ruptured his ACL in his right knee in the Knick's final game in Kansas City before the Kings' move to Sacramento. King was out of action for two whole seasons. He would come back in 1987–88, but would not return to the All-Star Game until 1990–91.
This season marked Michael Jordan's, Akeem Olajuwon's, Charles Barkley's and John Stockton's rookie seasons in the NBA.
This season saw the final season for Dan Issel, Billy Knight, M.L. Carr and Lionel Hollins.
Due to a roof collapse at the Pontiac Silverdome, the Pistons were forced to rent the Joe Louis Arena, home of the NHL's Detroit Red Wings, for the remainder of the season and into the playoffs. Both the Pistons and the Red Wings would move their home games to the Little Caesars Arena, starting in 2017.
At age 38, Kareem Abdul-Jabbar became the oldest player to win the honor of Finals MVP. Jabbar's team, the Lakers, became the first visiting team to win the NBA title at Boston Garden, beating their archrivals, the Boston Celtics, in six games.
 The Finals adopted the 2–3–2 format which was used through the 2013 NBA Finals after which the league returned to the 2–2–1–1–1 format.
The Cleveland Cavaliers returned to the playoffs after a seven-year absence. They were eliminated by the Celtics in four games. They would not make the playoffs again until 1988. The Cavaliers were coached by George Karl, then making his NBA coaching debut.
At New Orleans' Lakefront Arena (where the Atlanta Hawks played 12 of 41 home games that season), Larry Bird scored a Celtics' franchise record 60 points in Boston's 126–115 victory over the Hawks on March 12. Bird broke the previous franchise record set by teammate Kevin McHale (56) nine days earlier at Boston Garden against the Pistons.
The Denver Nuggets made the Conference Finals for the first time since 1978, losing 4–1 to the Lakers. They would not make the Conference Finals again until 2009, which they lost to the Lakers again. The series marked the end of Dan Issel's playing career, having played 15 professional seasons and averaging 22.6 points and 9.1 rebounds in his career.
It would be shortened  next season to the current . The NBA logo is added on the lower left hand corner of the backboard starting this season.

Final standings

By division

By conference

Notes
z – Clinched home court advantage for the entire playoffs
c – Clinched home court advantage for the conference playoffs
y – Clinched division title 
x – Clinched playoff spot

Playoffs

Teams in bold advanced to the next round. The numbers to the left of each team indicate the team's seeding in its conference, and the numbers to the right indicate the number of games the team won in that round. The division champions are marked by an asterisk. Home court advantage does not necessarily belong to the higher-seeded team, but instead the team with the better regular season record; teams enjoying the home advantage are shown in italics.

Statistics leaders

NBA awards

Yearly awards
Most Valuable Player: Larry Bird, Boston Celtics
Rookie of the Year: Michael Jordan, Chicago Bulls
Defensive Player of the Year: Mark Eaton, Utah Jazz
Sixth Man of the Year: Kevin McHale, Boston Celtics
Coach of the Year: Don Nelson, Milwaukee Bucks

All-NBA First Team:
F – Larry Bird, Boston Celtics
F – Bernard King, New York Knicks
C – Moses Malone, Philadelphia 76ers
G – Isiah Thomas, Detroit Pistons
G – Magic Johnson, Los Angeles Lakers

All-NBA Second Team:
F – Terry Cummings, Milwaukee Bucks
F – Ralph Sampson, Houston Rockets
C – Kareem Abdul-Jabbar, Los Angeles Lakers
G – Michael Jordan, Chicago Bulls
G – Sidney Moncrief, Milwaukee Bucks

All-NBA Rookie Team:
Charles Barkley (F), Philadelphia 76ers
Sam Perkins (F), Dallas Mavericks
Akeem Olajuwon (C), Houston Rockets
Sam Bowie (C), Portland Trail Blazers
Michael Jordan (G), Chicago Bulls

NBA All-Defensive First Team:
Sidney Moncrief, Milwaukee Bucks
Paul Pressey, Milwaukee Bucks
Mark Eaton, Utah Jazz
Michael Cooper, Los Angeles Lakers
Maurice Cheeks, Philadelphia 76ers

NBA All-Defensive Second Team:
Bobby Jones, Philadelphia 76ers
Danny Vranes, Seattle SuperSonics
Akeem Olajuwon, Houston Rockets
Dennis Johnson, Boston Celtics
T. R. Dunn, Denver Nuggets

Player of the week
The following players were named NBA Player of the Week.

Player of the month
The following players were named NBA Player of the Month.

Rookie of the month
The following players were named NBA Rookie of the Month.

Coach of the month
The following coaches were named NBA Coach of the Month.

References